Dawesfield, also known as Camp Morris, is an historic country house estate located in Ambler in Whitpain Township, Montgomery County, Pennsylvania. The property has eleven contributing buildings, one contributing site, and one contributing structure. They include the two-and-one-half-story, stone main dwelling (c. 1736–1870), stone barn (1795, 1937), stone tenant house (1845), frame farm manager's house (1884), and eight stone-and-frame outbuildings (1736-1952). The property features landscaped grounds, a stone wall, and terraced lawns.

It was added to the National Register of Historic Places in 1991.

History and features
Dawesfield, which belonged to James Morris, served as General George Washington's headquarters after the Battle of Germantown from October 20 to November 2, 1777.

It was added to the National Register of Historic Places in 1991. The property is composed of eleven contributing buildings, one contributing site and one contributing structure, including the two-and-one-half-story, stone main dwelling (c. 1736–1870), stone barn (1795, 1937), stone tenant house (1845), frame farm manager's house (1884), and eight stone-and-frame outbuildings (1736-1952). The property features landscaped grounds, a stone wall, and terraced lawns.

See also
List of Washington's Headquarters during the Revolutionary War

References

External links

Houses on the National Register of Historic Places in Pennsylvania
Houses in Montgomery County, Pennsylvania
National Register of Historic Places in Montgomery County, Pennsylvania